Inzaghi may refer to:
 Filippo Inzaghi, Italian former footballer, currently a manager
 Simone Inzaghi, Italian former footballer and current manager; brother of Filippo Inzaghi
 Inzaghi Donígio, Bissau-Guinean footballer
 Inzaghi, Vincenzo's pigeon companion

Italian-language surnames